Nanna Kristina Jansson (born July 7, 1983 in Gävle, Sweden) is an ice hockey player from Sweden. She won a silver medal at the 2006 Winter Olympics and a bronze medal at the 2002 Winter Olympics.

References

1983 births
Living people
Ice hockey players at the 2002 Winter Olympics
Ice hockey players at the 2006 Winter Olympics
Medalists at the 2002 Winter Olympics
Medalists at the 2006 Winter Olympics
Olympic bronze medalists for Sweden
Olympic ice hockey players of Sweden
Olympic medalists in ice hockey
Olympic silver medalists for Sweden
People from Gävle
Swedish women's ice hockey players
Sportspeople from Gävleborg County